The 1918 Oregon gubernatorial election took place on November 5, 1918 to elect the governor of the U.S. state of Oregon. The election matched incumbent Republican James Withycombe against Democratic State Senator Walter M. Pierce.

Withycombe's reelection campaign capitalized on his wartime acts, portraying him as a wartime Governor actively protecting the state and aiding the defense of the United States. Withycombe died in office in March 1919, just two months into his second term. As prescribed by Oregon law, Oregon Secretary of State Ben Olcott succeeded Withycombe in office.

Results

References

Gubernatorial
1918
Oregon
November 1918 events